Ailing may refer to:

 ailing in health, see ail (health)
 Ailing (Chinese name) (♀; given name; aka Ai-ling), several Chinese female given names
 Charles Ailing Gifford (♂; 1860–1937) U.S. architect
 Ailing Dojčin (♂) culture hero of Balkan epic poetry

See also

 Gladys Li Ling-Ai (1908–2003) Chinese-American filmmaker
 Ai (disambiguation)
 Ail (disambiguation)
 Ing (disambiguation)
 Ling (disambiguation)
 
 
 
 Eileen (disambiguation), sometimes used as an anglicization of the Chinese Ailing
 Irene (disambiguation), sometimes used as an anglicisation of the Chinese Ailing